Stephanie Okwu  (born 1994) is a Nigerian beauty queen who crowned as Most Beautiful Girl in Nigeria Universe 2013 and she represented Nigeria at the Miss Universe 2013 pageant in Russia.

Early life
Okwu is a graduate of the University of Lagos.

Most Beautiful Girl in Nigeria
Okwu represented Imo state at the Most Beautiful Girl In Nigeria Universe 2013. She won the pageantry and represented Nigeria at the Miss Universe 2013 competition in Moscow, Russia.

References

External links
 Official Most Beautiful Girl in Nigeria website

1994 births
Living people
People from Imo State
Nigerian beauty pageant winners
Miss Universe 2013 contestants
Most Beautiful Girl in Nigeria winners
Igbo people